Crystal Gayle's Greatest Hits is the fifth compilation album by the American country music artist of the same name, and the first to package her recordings from Columbia Records.  All the material on this album is from the three albums she recorded on Columbia Records:  Miss the Mississippi, These Days, and Hollywood, Tennessee. It was released in August 1983 on Columbia Records.

Track listing

Chart performance

Crystal Gayle albums
1983 compilation albums
Albums produced by Allen Reynolds
Columbia Records compilation albums